Robert John Slater (6 December 1960 – August 13, 1995) was an American mountaineer known for his first ascent of the big wall route Wyoming Sheep Ranch on El Capitan.  A tireless outdoor recreationalist, Slater built up an impressive climbing resume during his college years and later as he worked as a trader on the Chicago Board of Trade and for Goldman Sachs. He died on August 13, 1995, while descending from the summit of K2.

Rob started climbing early, summiting the Grand Teton at age 13 with mountaineering pioneer Paul Petzoldt.  He attended high school in Cheyenne, Wyoming and college at the University of Colorado at Boulder, an institution he chose for its beautiful location beneath the Flatirons and, according to fellow climber John Sherman, its beautiful female students.  Slater soon demonstrated his nerve in nearby Eldorado Canyon by dispatching the testpiece route Wide Country (11a R), still difficult today even though the availability of sticky rubber climbing shoes and micronuts has reduced the challenge.

While in college, Slater began making summer trips to Yosemite Valley, where he climbed his first big wall route Zodiac with Tom Cosgriff and climbed Aquarian Wall with Robert Kayen.  During his junior year Slater met Randy Leavitt, who taught Slater how to BASE jump.  Attempting a risky jump with Leavitt in the Black Canyon of the Gunnison, Slater was forced to make a downwind landing on the wrong side of the river, twisting his foot and scrubbing their plans to exit the canyon by climbing one of the walls.

Slater was one of the top aid climbers of his day.  In 1982, he made the first solo ascent of the Pacific Ocean Wall, at the time one of the hardest routes on El Capitan.  Slater naturally capped his ascent with a BASE jump.  In 1984 Slater put up Wyoming Sheep Ranch (A5) with John Barbella.  Caught by nightfall in the middle of a difficult and overhung pitch, Slater lowered off 40' on hooks, and Barbella had to pull him in 20' to the belay.  Wyoming Sheep Ranch held title for many years as the most difficult and dangerous aid climb on El Cap, but the inevitable widening of placements and appearance of fixed gear has subsequently reduced the grade to A4.

As a specialist in climbs with poor protection, Slater was drawn to the Fisher Towers near Moab, Utah, famous for their soft, crumbly rock.   Slater was the first and as of 1995 the only climber to summit all of the towers.

Slater may be the first person to take a leash-protected fall on a highline slackline.  In 1983 he set up a short 22' line under a freeway overpass in Pasadena with Scott Balcom and others.  The line was 80' above the ground.  Even though Slater only had 15 minutes of slacklining practice at the ground level, he was the first in the group to attempt to walk the line.

Slater excelled at all types of climbing, having ascended the 3000' ice route Slipstream in the Canadian Rockies as well as K2 without bottled oxygen.  Slater perished in a storm on the descent from K2 along with 5 other climbers, including his team member, noted English climber Alison Hargreaves.

Bibliography

"Honed: Rob Slater, Summit or Death, Either Way I Win"  By Rich Slater 2011

See also
1995 K2 disaster

External links
 The Last Ascent of Alison Hargreaves – Originally from Outside Magazine

1960 births
1995 deaths
American rock climbers
Mountaineering deaths on K2